Dror Biran (born 1977) is an Israeli pianist. He is a graduate from the University of Tel Aviv's Rubin Music Academy and the Cleveland Institute of Music, where he earned his doctorate in studies with Paul Schenly and Daniel Shapiro. Biran was prized at the 1995 Mikolajus Ciurlionis Competition (2nd prize - ex-aequo with Evgeny Samoilov) and the Cleveland Competition (1997, 4th prize). He subsequently won the Pilar Bayona Competition (1998) and the Spring Competition in Tel Aviv (2000). He has performed internationally, both as a soloist and chamber musician. Formerly teaching at Youngstown State University and Case Western Reserve University, Biran currently holds an assistant piano professor position at the University of Louisville School of Music.

Notes and references

External links
 Performance of Sergey Prokofiev's 8th Piano Sonata
 YouTube channel of Dror Biran
 YSU Digital Maag photograph of Biran in performance at YSU's annual piano week.

Living people
1977 births
Israeli classical pianists
Prize-winners of the Pilar Bayona Piano Competition
Cleveland International Piano Competition prize-winners
Jewish classical pianists
Cleveland Institute of Music alumni
21st-century classical pianists